Grings may refer to:

 Dadeus Grings (born 1936), Brazilian bishop
 Harry Gring (1918–1992), American politician
 Inka Grings (born 1978), German football player
 Marlon Grings (born 1976), Brazilian canoer